Pallikondan is a town in the Thanjavur (administrative district) of Thanjavur, Tamil Nadu, India.

Etymology 
 The origin of "pallikonda" is uncertain. The word may be derived from pallikondan, "the country of the pallikondan". According to a Hindu legend, vishnu descended lying on Ranganathar Temple

Thanjavur district